Justyna Burska (born 7 April 1995) is a Polish swimmer. In 2019, she competed in the women's 5 km and women's 10 km events at the 2019 World Aquatics Championships held in Gwangju, South Korea. In the 5 km event she finished in 34th place and in the 10 km event she finished in 47th place.

References 

Living people
1995 births
Place of birth missing (living people)
Polish female long-distance swimmers